Church of the Nativity of Mary, may refer to:

Belarus
 Church of the Nativity of the Blessed Virgin Mary, Muravanka

Croatia 
 Church of the Nativity of the Theotokos, Drežnica
 Church of the Nativity of the Theotokos, Gaboš
 , former cathedral of the former Roman Catholic Diocese of Skradin
 Church of the Nativity of the Theotokos, Srijemske Laze

Czech Republic
 Church of the Nativity of the Blessed Virgin Mary (Písek)

Malta
 Church of Mary's Nativity within the Fort, Birgu
 Parish Church of the Nativity of the Virgin Mary, Mellieħa
 Church of the Nativity of Mary, Naxxar
 Victory Church, Qormi, also known as the Church of the Nativity of Mary
 Church of the Nativity of Our Lady, Rabat
 Basilica of the Nativity of Mary, Senglea
 Church of the Nativity of Our Lady (Savina), Victoria, Gozo
 Basilica of the Nativity of Our Lady, Xagħra

North Macedonia
 Church of the Nativity of the Theotokos, Skopje

Romania
 Church of the Nativity of the Theotokos, Focșani
 Church of the Nativity of the Theotokos, Zărnești

Russia
 Church of the Nativity of the Blessed Virgin Mary (Konygin)
 Nativity Church in the Kremlin, Moscow
 Nativity Church at Putinki, Moscow
 Church of the Nativity of the Theotokos, Antoniev Monastery, near Novgorod
 Church of the Nativity of the Theotokos, Peryn
 Rostov-on-Don Cathedral

Serbia
 Church of the Nativity of the Theotokos, Novaci
 Church of the Nativity of the Theotokos, Obilić

Singapore
 Church of the Nativity of the Blessed Virgin Mary, Singapore

Slovakia
 Church of the Nativity of the Blessed Virgin Mary, Michalovce

Spain
 Church of la Natividad de Nuestra Señora (San Martín de la Vega)
 Church of la Natividad de Nuestra Señora, Valdetorres de Jarama

Poland
 Church of the Nativity of the Blessed Virgin Mary, Warsaw

Ukraine
 Church of the Nativity of the Theotokos, Kryvyi Rih
 Church of the Nativity of the Theotokos, Sambir

United States
 Church of the Nativity of the Theotokos, Afognak
 Nativity of the Blessed Virgin Mary Catholic Church, Cassella, Ohio

See also
 Cathedral of the Nativity of the Theotokos (disambiguation)
 Cathedral of the Nativity of the Blessed Virgin Mary (disambiguation)
 Church of the Nativity of the Theotokos (disambiguation)
 Church of the Nativity (disambiguation)
 Church of the Dormition of the Theotokos (disambiguation)